Brunehamel is a commune in the department of Aisne in Hauts-de-France in northern France.

Géography
It is between Hirson and Vervins.

Population

See also
Communes of the Aisne department

References

Communes of Aisne
Aisne communes articles needing translation from French Wikipedia